Nimantha Peiris (born 18 April 1994) is a Sri Lankan cricketer. He made his List A debut on 24 March 2021, for Panadura Sports Club in the 2020–21 Major Clubs Limited Over Tournament.

References

External links
 

1994 births
Living people
Sri Lankan cricketers
Panadura Sports Club cricketers
Place of birth missing (living people)